Prateek Sachdeva, better known as Betta Naan Stop, is an Indian drag queen, model and Dancer from India.  Betta has been performing drag for 6 years and has been the mainstream drag artist of Indian LGBT Community. Prateek is one of the headliner performer of Lalit Group's Queer nightlife club chain, Kittysu.

Biography 
Prateek started his career as a dancer with Ashley Lobo’s DanceWorx and got a scholarship programmed in Melbourne, and after he trained further in musical theatre, came back to his home in Delhi. When Violet Chachki performed at Kitty Su Delhi’s sixth anniversary, Prateek decided to attend in drag and that's the time he realized to be a drag queen. After a series of make-up sessions with his flight-attendant sister, and a viewing of Paris Is Burning and several seasons of RuPaul's Drag Race later. Sachdeva began to up his game and experiment more with drag. His first performance was as part of a sex-education workshop at St Columbus School in the capital, it wasn’t planned, but soon he was up on stage breaking out his best moves. Soon he wrote a piece on drag for Youthkiawaaz, and promptly got a call from Keshav Suri  to perform at Kitty Su. And that’s when Betta Naan Stop was born, a beautiful feminine queen, known for her expert dance moves.

While asking about drag, Prateek said "I think anyone who has any kind of following and influence should use their platforms for betterment of the society. Sometimes you being your authentic self is a big move in itself!". In case, there is someone who wants to be like you, can see for themselves your journey and your achievements, your challenges and tribulations.

References 
  

Living people
Indian drag queens
Year of birth missing (living people)